The 2017–18 UAB Blazers women's basketball team represents the University of Alabama at Birmingham during the 2017–18 NCAA Division I women's basketball season. The Blazers, led by fifth year head coach Randy Norton, play their home games at the Bartow Arena and are members of Conference USA. They finished the season 27–7, 13–3 in C-USA play to win the C-USA regular season. They advanced to the championship game of the C-USA women's tournament where they lost to Western Kentucky. They received an automatic bid to the Women's National Invitation Tournament where they defeated Chattanooga in the first round before losing to Georgia Tech in the second round.

Roster

Schedule

|-
!colspan=9 style="background:#006600; color:#CFB53B;"| Exhibition

|-
!colspan=9 style="background:#006600; color:#CFB53B;"| Non-conference regular season

|-
!colspan=9 style="background:#006600; color:#CFB53B;"| Conference USA regular season

|-
!colspan=9 style=| Conference USA Women's Tournament

|-
!colspan=9 style=| WNIT

Rankings
2017–18 NCAA Division I women's basketball rankings

See also
 2017–18 UAB Blazers men's basketball team

References

UAB Blazers women's basketball seasons
UAB
UAB